Santa Lucía de Tirajana is a town and a Spanish municipality in the south-eastern part of the island of Gran Canaria, in the Province of Las Palmas, in the Canary Islands.

Geography 

The municipality includes the larger towns Cruce de Sardina, El Doctoral and Vecindario, located near the coast.

The GC-1 passes through the south-eastern part of the municipality.

Population

Heritage sites
[[File:Zona arqueológica La Fortaleza (6).jpg|thumb|left|{{center|La Fortaleza}}]]

The archaeological site La Fortaleza is listed as a Property of cultural interest.

There are nine water mills dating from the 19th century, built on the Riego de la Zarcilla river. Most of them kept working up to the 1970s. Since then, many fell into disrepair. Ownership may be public or private. On the municipality, the two mills of El Valle (olive oil for one and gofio for the other) were declared properties of cultural interest in 2003. D. Benjamín González Araña, who owns the olive oil mill, had its restoration completed in 2004. The council of Gran Canaria had the gofio'' mill repaired in 2003.

See also
List of municipalities in Las Palmas

Gallery
<div align=center>

Iglesia Santa Lucía de Tirajana

Public art

</div align=center>

Notes

References

External links
 Santa Lucía de Tirajana website

Municipalities in Gran Canaria